Cocke is a surname (pronounced cock, cox or coke) and may refer to:

Charles Lewis Cocke (1940- ) Professor of Physics at Kansas State University, winner of 2006 Davisson–Germer Prize in Atomic or Surface Physics
Erle Cocke Jr.  (1921-2000), International banking consultant and lobbyist
James Cocke, mayor of Williamsburg, Virginia in the eighteenth century
James Richard Cocke (1863–1900), American physician, homeopath, and a pioneer hypnotherapist
John Cocke (1925–2002), American computer scientist
John Alexander Cocke (1772–1854), American politician who represented Tennessee
John Hartwell Cocke (1780–1866), American planter and brigadier general in the War of 1812
Martha Louisa Cocke (1855-1938), American college president
Philip St. George Cocke (1809–1861), Confederate general during the American Civil War
William Cocke (1747–1828), one of the first U.S. senators from Tennessee
W. A. Cocke (1796–1844), third mayor of Louisville, Kentucky
William Michael Cocke (1815–1896), grandson of William Cocke who also represented Tennessee

See also
 Cock (surname)
 Cooke
 Coke (disambiguation)
 John Cocke (disambiguation)
 Cocke County, Tennessee